German-Russian or Russian-German (with or without hyphen) may refer to:
Germany–Russia relations (c.f. a "German–Russian treaty")
Germans in the old Russian Empire or present-day Russia
Russia Germans or Germans from Russia
History of Germans in Russia, Ukraine and the Soviet Union
Baltic Germans
Black Sea Germans
Caucasus Germans (the area is now divided between several countries)
Crimea Germans
Volga Germans
Volga Germans in the United States
Volhynian Germans (Germans of Volhynia (Poland and Ukraine))
Russian-speaking population groups in Germany
Russian Mennonites
Germans from Russia
People with multiple citizenship of Germany and Russia